(born 1972) is a Japanese manga artist, born in Hamamatsu, Shizuoka Prefecture, Japan. He is best known for his manga series Kaishain no Melody, which won the 1998 Bungeishunjū Manga Award (for the second volume—the first volume was nominated but did not win). He made his professional debut with Seikimatsu na Yatsura in the February 1993 issue of Manga Life Variety.

Works
Listed in alphabetical order.
Baraado Machi
Biidama-kun
Elec.King
Gokuraku Taishō
Hitokusari Kozō
Kabe ni Mimi Ari Shōji ni Me Arī
Kaishain no Melody (7 volumes)
Kemonohen
Kido Aigyō Ikka
Pū Ichizoku
Rusuban no Tatsujin
Strange Parachute

Sources:

References

External links
 Elec.King official site

1971 births
Manga artists from Shizuoka Prefecture
Living people
People from Hamamatsu